Marta Tejedor Munuera (born 23 December 1968) is a Spanish football coach who most recently managed Birmingham City of the FA Women's Super League.

She had also coached the women's national teams of Chile and Peru.

References

External links
 Birmingham City profile

1968 births
Living people
Footballers from Las Palmas
Women's association football midfielders
Women's Super League managers
Spanish expatriate football managers
Expatriate football managers in England
Expatriate football managers in Chile
Expatriate football managers in Peru
Spanish expatriates in Peru
Spanish expatriates in Chile
Spanish expatriates in England
Spanish women's footballers
Female association football managers
Chile women's national football team managers
Peru women's national football team managers
Birmingham City W.F.C. managers